Konggang Square Station is a station on Line 3 of Chongqing Rail Transit in Chongqing municipality, China. It is located in Yubei District and opened in 2016. This station is also the only underground station of Line 3 Konggang Branch.

Station structure

References

Railway stations in Chongqing
Railway stations in China opened in 2016
Chongqing Rail Transit stations